Charles Dodgson may refer to:

 Charles Lutwidge Dodgson (1832–1898), better known by the pseudonym Lewis Carroll, renowned children's and fantasy author
 Charles Dodgson (bishop) (c. 1722–1795), Anglican Bishop of Elphin, grandfather of the priest
 Charles Dodgson (priest) (1800–1868), Anglican Archdeacon of Richmond, father of the author